Nonoc (stylized as nonoc, born July 12) is a Japanese singer from Utashinai, Hokkaido who is affiliated with Kadokawa Corporation. She made her debut in 2018 with the release of the songs "Relive" and "White White Snow", which were used in the original video animation Re:Zero − Starting Life in Another World: Memory Snow. Her first single "Kodo" was released on February 27, 2019 and peaked at number 70 on Oricon's weekly singles charts; the title track is used as the opening theme to the anime television series Magical Girl Spec-Ops Asuka. Her second single "start*frost" was released on August 7, 2019; the title song was used as the opening theme to the anime television series Astra Lost in Space, while the second song "Hollow Veil" was used as the episode 5 ending theme to the anime Isekai Quartet. Her third single "Memento" was released on September 2, 2020; the title song is used as the first ending theme to the second season of Re:Zero − Starting Life in Another World. Her digital single "Reloaded" was used as Re:Zero − Starting Life in Another World Lost in Memories game theme song. Her fourth single "Believe in you" was released on March 3, 2021; the title song is used as the second ending theme to the second season of Re:Zero − Starting Life in Another World.

Her fifth single "Change" was released on February 2, 2022; the title song will be used as the ending theme to the anime television series Police in a Pod. Also in 2022, nonoc's sixth single, "Tomoshibi", was used as the opening theme to the anime television series Spy Classroom.

Discography

Singles

Other appearances

References

External links
 Agency profile 

Anime musicians
Living people
Japanese women pop singers
Musicians from Hokkaido
Year of birth missing (living people)